The women's 4 × 400 metres relay event at the 2002 Commonwealth Games was held on July 30–31.

Medalists

* Athletes who competed in heats only and received medals.

Results

Heats
Qualification: First 3 teams of each heat (Q) plus the next 2 fastest (q) qualified for the final.

Final

References
Official results
Results at BBC

Relay
2002
2002 in women's athletics